Events from the year 1995 in Sweden

Incumbents
 Monarch – Carl XVI Gustaf
 Prime Minister – Ingvar Carlsson

Events

1 January
Sweden accedes to the European Union.

September
 Establishment of the Haparanda Archipelago National Park.

November
 The November Storm of 1995

Popular culture

Literature
 Hummelhonung, novel by Torgny Lindgren, winner of the August Prize.
 Underbara kvinnor vid vatten, novel by Monika Fagerholm, received the Thanks for the Book Award
 Comédia infantil, novel by Henning Mankell, English translation Chronicler of the Winds (2006).

Sports 
 5–13 August – the 1995 World Championships in Athletics were held in Gothenburg
 The 1995 Allsvenskan was won by IFK Göteborg

Births

 6 June – Jonna Adlerteg, gymnast 
 21 June – Jesper Karlström, footballer
 6 August – Rebecca Peterson, Swedish tennis player
 2 November – Hanna Öberg, biathlete

Deaths
 8 June – Erik Beckman, poet, novelist and playwright (born 1935).
 16 June – Tore Edman, ski jumper (born 1904)
 13 September – Birger Norman, journalist, poet, novelist, playwright and non-fiction writer (born 1914).
 14 October – Karl Widmark, canoer (born 1911)

References

External links

 
Years of the 20th century in Sweden
Sweden
1990s in Sweden
Sweden